LN Garden Hotel or The Garden Hotel is a "Platinum 5-Star Hotel" in Guangzhou and was the Headquarters Hotel of the 16th Asian Games. It is located in the Yuexiu District.

The Garden Hotel consists of two buildings: Hotel Tower and Garden Tower. Its site is 48,000m², with 21,000m² of gardens. The logo for the hotel is a kapok, the city flower of Guangzhou.

Hotel Facilities
The Garden Hotel has 828 guest rooms and suites, 151 apartments, 8 multi-function rooms, a ballroom and 9 dining rooms. The Health Club and spa are located in the Roof Garden on the 4th Floor. The recreational facilities of the hotel include an outdoor swimming pool, gym, steam room, sauna room, tennis courts and squash courts. The hotel also has a business centre, shopping arcade and parking.

The hotel lobby is decorated with both Chinese and Western styles, to replicate an ancient palace with murals and marble to reflect traditional social customs.

The back garden features a waterfall, rockery, fresco and pavilion.

Hotel History

Awards

Celebrities
The Garden Hotel has hosted many VIPs, including:
 King Carl XVI Gustaf of Sweden
 H.H. Ahmed Al-Fahad Al-Ahmed Al-Sabah, President of the Olympic Council of Asia
 Mr. Ludwig Scotty, former President of Nauru
 H.E. Mr. Abhisit Vejjajiva, Prime Minister of Thailand
 Mr. Valéry Giscard d'Estaing, former President of France
 Mr. Edward Heath, former Prime Minister of the United Kingdom
 Mr. Pierre Trudeau, former Prime Minister of Canada
 Mr. Bob Hawke, former Prime Minister of Australia
 Mr. Toshiki Kaifu, former Prime Minister of Japan
 Mr. Lee Kuan Yew, Minister Mentor and former Prime Minister of Singapore
 Ms. Margaret Beckett, M.P., former Secretary of State for Foreign and Commonwealth Affairs of the United Kingdom
 Russian singer Vitas

References

External links

The Official Website of The Garden Hotel, Guangzhou

Hotels in Guangzhou
Yuexiu District
Hotel buildings completed in 1985
Hotels established in 1985